Jan Kodeš (born 1 March 1946) is a Czech former professional tennis player. A three-time major singles champion, Kodeš was one of the premier players in the early 1970s.

Kodeš's greatest success was achieved on the clay courts of the French Open, where he won the singles title in 1970 and 1971. However, he also won Wimbledon on grass courts in 1973, although the tournament was largely boycotted by top players that year over the ban of Nikola Pilić by the International Lawn Tennis Federation (ILTF).

Kodeš never played at the Australian Open, but was twice the runner-up at the US Open, in 1971 and 1973. Kodeš reached his highest ATP ranking of world No. 5 in September 1973. During the Open Era, he won nine top-level singles titles and 17 doubles titles.

Kodeš was inducted into the International Tennis Hall of Fame in 1990. In 2013, he received the Czech Fair Play Award from the Czech Olympic Committee. He is an economics graduate of the Prague University.

Career statistics

Grand Slam finals: 5 (3 titles, 2 runner-ups)

Grand Slam singles performance timeline

1 Start of the Open Era.
1968 French Open counts as 0 wins, 0 losses. Fernando Gentil received a walkover in the first round, after Kodeš withdrew, does not count as a Kodeš loss (nor a Gentil win).

Open era finals

Singles (9 titles, 19 runner-ups)

Doubles (17 titles, 24 runner-ups)

At results above are not shown wins and runner-ups from 1965 to 1969, such as tournaments in Santiago, Viňa del Mar, São Paulo, Lyon, Cannes, Luxembourg, Split, Varna, Plovdiv, Paris (Racing Club) or International championships of Czechoslovakia in Bratislava. The draws of players were always minimum 32 players, same as at contemporary ATP Tour events, but they are not listed in ATP Annuals, since ATP was founded at 1972.

References

Further reading
Jan Kodeš, with Petr Kolar, A Journey to Glory from behind the Iron Curtain, New Chapter Press, Chicago, 2010,

External links
 
 
 
 

Czech male tennis players
Czechoslovak male tennis players
French Open champions
Tennis players from Prague
International Tennis Hall of Fame inductees
Wimbledon champions
1946 births
Living people
Grand Slam (tennis) champions in men's singles